Kisan Vikas Patra is a saving certificate scheme which was first launched in 1988 by India Post. It was successful in the early months but afterwards the Government of India set up a committee under supervision of Shyamala Gopinath which gave its recommendation to the Government that KVP could be misused. Hence the Government of India decided to close this scheme and KVP was closed in 2011 and the new government re-launched it in 2014.

Kisan Vikas Patra can be purchased by :
 An adult in his own name, or on behalf of a minor
 A Trust
 Two adults jointly

Investment limitations
KVP certificates are available in the denominations of Rs 1000, Rs 5000, Rs 10000 and Rs 50000. The minimum amount that can be invested is Rs 1000. However, there is no upper limit on the purchase of KVPs.

Tax benefits
Kisan Vikas Patra does not offer any income tax benefits to the investor. No deduction u/s 80C is allowed on investment and the interest received upon maturity/withdrawal is fully taxable. However, withdrawals are exempted from Tax Deduction at Source (TDS) upon maturity.

Interest income
The amount (Principal) invested in Kisan Vikas Patra would get doubled in 124 months as per existing rate of interest. The rate of interest was slashed to 6.9% with effect from 1 April 2020 to 31 March 2021

Withdrawal
The amount of KVP can be withdrawn after 124 months (10 years and 04 months). The maturity period of a KVP is 2 years 6 months (30 months). Premature encashment of the KVP certificate is not permissible.  The certificates can only be encashed in event of the death of the holder or forfeiture by a pledge or on the order of the courts.

References

Investment in India
Government finances in India
Bonds (finance)
1988 introductions
Postal system of India